New Boston is a village in Scioto County, Ohio, United States, along the Ohio River. The population was 2,272 at the 2010 census. Apart from its southern boundary on the Ohio River, New Boston is entirely surrounded by the city of Portsmouth.

New Boston is served by the Portsmouth Public Library and the New Boston Local School District.

History
New Boston was platted on February 17, 1891, by James Skelton, A.T. Holcomb, and M. Stanton. The village was named after Boston, Massachusetts, the native home of a share of the first settlers.

Geography
New Boston is located at  (38.753049, -82.935819).

New Boston is entirely surrounding on the west, north, and east by the City of Portsmouth and to the south by the Ohio River.

Demographics

2010 census
As of the census of 2010, there were 2,272 people, 1,065 households, and 537 families living in the village. The racial makeup of the village was 96.0% White, 1.1% African American, 0.3% Native American, 0.3% Asian, 0.3% from other races, and 2.1% from two or more races. Hispanic or Latino of any race were 0.9% of the population.

There were 1,065 households, of which 27.8% had children under the age of 18 living with them, 26.4% were married couples living together, 19.5% had a female householder with no husband present, 4.5% had a male householder with no wife present, and 49.6% were non-families. 44.9% of all households were made up of individuals, and 20.9% had someone living alone who was 65 years of age or older. The average household size was 2.08 and the average family size was 2.91.

The median age in the village was 40.3 years. 22.7% of residents were under the age of 18; 8.2% were between the ages of 18 and 24; 23.2% were from 25 to 44; 26.3% were from 45 to 64; and 19.5% were 65 years of age or older. The gender makeup of the village was 45.8% male and 54.2% female.

2000 census
As of the census of 2000, there were 2,340 people, 1,106 households, and 572 families living in the village. The population density was 2,114.4 people per square mile (813.9/km2). There were 1,248 housing units at an average density of 1,127.7 per square mile (434.1/km2). The racial makeup of the village was 97.74% White, 0.13% African American, 0.34% Native American, 0.09% Asian, 0.21% from other races, and 1.50% from two or more races. Hispanic or Latino of any race were 0.64% of the population.

There were 1,106 households, out of which 24.4% had children under the age of 18 living with them, 29.0% were married couples living together, 19.9% had a female householder with no husband present, and 48.2% were non-families. 44.1% of all households were made up of individuals, and 24.3% had someone living alone who was 65 years of age or older. The average household size was 2.06 and the average family size was 2.87.

In the village, the population was spread out, with 23.4% under the age of 18, 9.9% from 18 to 24, 23.3% from 25 to 44, 21.9% from 45 to 64, and 21.5% who were 65 years of age or older. The median age was 39 years. For every 100 females, there were 70.1 males. For every 100 females age 18 and over, there were 62.9 males.

The median income for a household in the village was $15,861, and the median income for a family was $25,036. Males had a median income of $23,158 versus $19,044 for females. The per capita income for the village was $13,810. About 28.2% of families and 32.2% of the population were below the poverty line, including 41.9% of those under age 18 and 24.0% of those age 65 or over.

Government
 William "Junior" Williams Jr. - Mayor
 Steve Hamilton - Village Administrator
 Jessica Grant - Clerk Of Courts
 Lana Loper- Clerk/Treasurer
 Lori Jordan - Income Tax Director
 Justin Blume -  Solicitor
 Robert C. Davis- Chief of Fire
 Carl Compton- Chief of Police

Village Council
 Dan Fetty
 Jon Mills
 Ralph Imes
 Ryan Ottney
 Mike Meehan 
 Corey Jones

Notable people
 Ron Giles (television executive), born 1942, an award-winning American television executive and an author
 Vern Riffe (1925-1997), Speaker of the Ohio House of Representatives

See also
 List of cities and towns along the Ohio River

Gallery

References

External links
 Village website

Villages in Scioto County, Ohio
Villages in Ohio
Ohio populated places on the Ohio River